The Klamath River (Karuk: Ishkêesh, Klamath: Koke, Yurok: Hehlkeek 'We-Roy) flows  through Oregon and northern California in the United States, emptying into the Pacific Ocean. By average discharge, the Klamath is the second largest river in California after the Sacramento River. It drains an extensive watershed of almost  that stretches from the arid country of south-central Oregon to the temperate rainforest of the Pacific coast. Unlike most rivers, the Klamath begins in the high desert and flows toward the mountains – carving its way through the rugged Cascade Range and Klamath Mountains before reaching the sea. The upper basin, today used for farming and ranching, once contained vast freshwater marshes that provided habitat for abundant wildlife, including millions of migratory birds. Most of the lower basin remains wild, with much of it designated wilderness. The watershed is known for this peculiar geography, and the Klamath has been called "a river upside down" by National Geographic magazine.

The Klamath is the most important North American river south of the Columbia River for anadromous fish migration. Its salmon, steelhead and rainbow trout have adapted to unusually high water temperatures and acidity levels relative to other rivers in the Pacific Northwest. The numerous fish were a major source of food for Native Americans, who have inhabited the basin for at least 7,000 years. The first Europeans to enter the Klamath River basin were fur trappers for the Hudson's Bay Company in the 1820s; they established the Siskiyou Trail along the Klamath and Trinity rivers into the Sacramento Valley. Within several decades of European settlement, native peoples were forced into reservations. During the latter days of the California Gold Rush, increasing numbers of miners began working the Klamath River and its tributaries, causing considerable harm to the environment. Conflict and introduced diseases decimated indigenous tribes, reducing them to only 10% of their original population.

Steamboats operated briefly on the large lakes of the upper basin, contributing to the growth of towns such as Klamath Falls, Oregon, before they were replaced by railroads in the late 19th century. In the 19th and 20th centuries, the upper basin became a productive agricultural region, and many dams were built to provide irrigation and hydroelectricity. In the 1960s, the Klamath River was targeted by much larger but ultimately unsuccessful schemes to augment water supplies in other parts of California. One of these projects, the Klamath Diversion, would have reversed the entire flow of the Klamath River to supply farms and urban areas in central and southern California.

Today, the Klamath is a popular recreational river as well as an important source of water for agriculture. It includes many of the longest free-flowing stretches of river in California, including excellent stretches of whitewater. However, dams and diversions in the upper basin have often caused water quality issues in the lower half of the river. Environmental groups and native tribes have proposed broad changes to water use in the Klamath Basin, including the removal of some dams on the river to expand fish habitat. They put forth their concerns in what is now the Klamath Basin Restoration Agreement, a water management plan signed by local communities, governments, tribal groups, environmentalists, and fishermen. The proposal has been endorsed by the U.S. Department of the Interior but has not been authorized by the United States Congress.

Course

Upper Klamath Lake, filling a broad valley at the foot of the eastern slope of the southern High Cascades, is the source of the Klamath River. The lake is fed by the Williamson River, which originates in the Winema National Forest, and the Wood River, which rises near Crater Lake National Park. Here, the Klamath is connected by the B canal to the Lost River; as part of the federal Klamath irrigation project, the canal is capable of diverting water between the rivers in either direction as needed.

Below the dam the river flows west, passing the mostly dry Lower Klamath Lake bed and the hydroelectric John C. Boyle Dam. The Klamath River then enters California, where it passes through three more hydroelectric plants and turns south near the town of Hornbrook towards Mount Shasta. However, the river soon swings west to receive the Shasta River and the Scott River, entering a long canyon through the Klamath Mountains.

The route through the Cascade Range and the Klamath Mountains constitutes the majority of the river's course and takes it from the arid high desert climate of its upper watershed towards a temperate rainforest nourished by Pacific rains. Below the Scott River confluence, the Klamath runs generally west along the south side of the Siskiyou Mountains until it takes a sharp southward turn near the town of Happy Camp. From there, it flows southwest over whitewater rapids through the Klamath National Forest and Six Rivers National Forest, receives the Salmon River from the east, and passes the community of Orleans. At Weitchpec, the river reaches the southernmost point in its course and veers sharply north as it receives its principal tributary, the Trinity River. Below this point, the Klamath's current slows as it approaches sea level. The mouth of the Klamath River is at Requa, in an area shared by the Yurok Reservation and Redwood National Park. The Klamath River estuary is recognized for protection by the California Bays and Estuaries Policy.

Watershed

Extending from arid eastern Oregon to the cool and rainy Northern California coast, the Klamath River watershed drains parts of three Oregon counties and five counties in California and includes a diversity of landscapes. The northernmost part of the watershed is high desert country drained by the Williamson River and the Sprague River, both of which flow generally southwest into Upper Klamath Lake. The middle basin is characterized by extensive wetland, grassland, and agricultural areas, and is partially filled by two major bodies of water: Upper and Lower Klamath Lake. The extensive lower basin, which encompasses over one half of the  watershed, is composed mainly of rugged mountains, forests and canyons.

Several other West Coast and interior drainage basins border on that of the Klamath River. On the northwest are the Rogue River and Umpqua River in Oregon and the Smith River in California. On the east there is the closed Harney Basin and a small portion of the Great Basin. The south side of the Klamath River watershed is bounded by the Sacramento River and its upper tributaries, including the Pit River, and on the southwest side are the Mad River and Redwood Creek. The western boundary of the upper Klamath Basin is formed by the High Cascades and the Klamath Mountains, and the California Coast Ranges cover the southwestern watershed. The Klamath is one of only three rivers that begins east of the Cascades and flows into the Pacific Ocean; the other two are the Columbia and the Fraser.

Most human use of the watershed is limited to the upper basin. Despite the semiarid climate, dams have been built, irrigation water has been supplied from the Klamath and Lost rivers, and plentiful groundwater has been drawn to transform most of the upper Klamath Basin to farmland. At least 11,000 years ago, Lower Klamath and Tule Lakes in the rainy season would combine into one giant freshwater marsh that was nearly  large. Although all of the marshlands have been developed with the exception of Upper Klamath Lake, about 3.7 million migrating birds still pass through the watershed each year.

Despite its plentiful flow in California, the Klamath does not supply significant amounts of water to irrigators and municipal users in central and southern portions of the state. The Klamath Reclamation Project in the Klamath Falls area supplies water to local irrigators, and the Central Valley Project diverts water from the Trinity River to supply irrigation water to the Sacramento Valley. Other tributaries of the Klamath, including the Lost and Shasta rivers, are also diverted for irrigation. Water use of the lower Klamath—one of the last relatively free-flowing rivers in the state of California—has been debated for decades among conservationists, tribes, irrigators, and government agencies, and its eventual fate is still unclear.

Tributaries

Tributaries of the Klamath River are listed below. Numbers (RM/RKM) after the tributary names denote the river miles (river kilometers) where they enter the Klamath, or the specific tributary under which it is listed.

Blue Creek (15.8/25.4)
Trinity River (43.5/70.0)
South Fork Trinity River (31.2/50.2)
Hayfork Creek (30.0/48.3)
New River (42.6/68.6)
North Fork Trinity River (72.5/116.7)
Canyon Creek (79.3/127.7)
Reading Creek (93.8/151.0)
Stuart Fork Trinity River (121.5/195.6)
East Fork Trinity River (135.2/217.7)
Coffee Creek (143.4/230.9)
Red Cap Creek (52.5/84.5)
Boise Creek (55.4/89.2)
Salmon River (California) (66.0/106.3)
Wooley Creek (5.0/8.1)
North Fork Salmon River (19.6/31.6)
Russian Creek (20.1/32.4)
South Fork Salmon River (19.6/31.6)
East Fork South Fork Salmon River (19.9/32.0)
Copper Creek (86.2/138.8)
Clear Creek (98.5/158.6)
Elk Creek (105.5/169.8)
Indian Creek (106.8/171.9)
Scott River (142.0/228.5)
South Fork Scott River (56.3/90.6)
East Fork Scott River (56.3/90.6)
Shasta River (176.3/283.7)
Little Shasta River (14.0/22.5)
Willow Creek (185.0/297.9)
Jenny Creek (194.5/313.1)
Thompson Creek
Lost River Diversion Channel (249.6/401.6)
Lost River (12.0/19.3) 
Miller Creek
Link River

Upper Klamath Lake
Wood River
Annie Creek
Sun Creek
Crooked Creek
Williamson River
Sprague River (10.9/17.5)
Sycan River (75.0/120.8)
Klamath Marsh
Big Springs Creek

Flooding
The lower and middle sections of the Klamath River are vulnerable to flooding, and major floods have occurred in years where major flooding has taken place in Northern California, particularly in the wake of Pineapple Express storms that bring large amounts of warm rain to Northern California. Fort Ter-Waw, located at what is now the town of Klamath Glen, was destroyed by the flood in December 1861 and abandoned on June 10, 1862. Other significant floods on the Klamath River have occurred in 1926–1927, 1955, 1964, 1997, and 2005, in several cases changing the course of the river. The Christmas flood of 1964 was particularly devastating.
The highway bridge was rebuilt in a different location, though entrances to the old bridge still stand.

The mouth of the Klamath and nearby sections of the river are susceptible to oceanic tsunami surges, and fatalities have occurred there during the 1964 and 2011 Japanese tsunami.

Geology
The Upper Klamath Basin, defined by the drainage area of the Klamath River above Iron Gate Dam, is a unique transitional area between the Cascade Range to the west and the Basin and Range Province of the northern Great Basin to the southeast. This region extends from the southern Lower Klamath Lake area into the Lost River and Upper Klamath Lake basins. Crustal stretching and block faulting created a topography with characteristics similar to both regions. Almost the entire basin is a graben region, bearing basin and range characteristics, formed by uplifting and subsidence along several north–south faults.

Pre-Quaternary, igneous and sedimentary rocks compose the Yonna Formation, which crosses much of the region and rises above the surface in large outcroppings of solid rock in many of the ridges. Underlying rocks are generally younger from east to west. An extensive geothermal system occurs deep underground within the upper basin, creating hot springs and artesian springs, but is not well understood. Further south, in the Shasta River area in Siskiyou County, much of the underlying rock is composed of lava flows issuing from the Mount Shasta volcanic region.

The same age pattern is true in the Cascade Range and Klamath Mountains that cover the western half of the Klamath River watershed. As the North American Plate moved slowly southwestward over the past 10 million years, successive oceanic terranes dating from the Cambrian to the late Jurassic were added to the bulk of the North American continent. There are four distinct terranes from west to east. While the coastal mountains date to less than 3 million years ago, the farther inland High Cascades are as old as 7.5 million years. Granite batholiths, overlying sedimentary rock, and volcanic rock were crumpled into the massif of southwestern Oregon and northwestern California. Instead of being diverted southwards, however, the Klamath continued to flow westward and created a steep-walled gorge through the rising range. When the Klamath encountered this layer, it began cutting its canyon along the mica instead of continuing southwest to the Pacific, resulting in the sharp northward bend where the Trinity River joins. The lower Trinity also follows portions of the mica and its south fork as well.

History

Early inhabitants and settlers

Human habitation on the Klamath dates to at least 7,000 years ago. Many of the Native American groups along the river depended on the huge runs of Pacific salmon, the third largest on the Pacific coast of what is now the United States. These groups included the Shasta along the middle and upper parts of the river, the Yurok, Hupa, and Karuk along the canyons of the lower river, and the Modoc, Klamath and Yahooskin in the desert valleys of the upper basin. About  of the Klamath River, or half the river's length, was on Shasta territory. Along with the Hupa and Karuk, the lower to mid-upper Tribes caught salmon from the river with weirs, basket traps and harpoons. Ishi Pishi Falls, a set of rapids on the Klamath River near the confluence with the Salmon River, has been a traditional fishing ground for thousands of years. Most of the upstream groups had a nomadic hunting-gathering lifestyle and did not depend on salmon as much as downstream tribes. The Klamath River's name was recorded by Europeans in the 19th century derived from the word klamet or the Klamath Tribe. Prior to European contact, the river was called by many different names, including Ishkêesh and Koke. The Klamath Tribe's name came from the Upper Chinookan word /ɬámaɬ/,
literally "they of the river".

The tribes along the Klamath River, in their hunting, fishing, and landscape stewardship practices, employed traditional ecological knowledge (TEK). Traditional ecological knowledge describes the type of natural science information that indigenous people have gathered about the places they live in over the course of hundreds, if not thousands, of years. It encompasses knowledge, beliefs, and practices that native people have accumulated through their immersive stewardship of the natural world. On the Klamath River, tribes have historically, and continue to, use traditional ecological knowledges and practices to care for and manage their landscape.

In the late 1820s, fur trappers of the Hudson's Bay Company traveling south from Fort Vancouver reached the Klamath River basin. The first party to see the Klamath River was led by Alexander McLeod in the winter of 1826–27. In 1828, the Jedediah Smith fur trapping expedition was helped across the Trinity River by the Yurok and camped on the east side of the Trinity River. His clerk, Harrison G. Rogers, wrote, "Mr. Smith purchases all the beaver furs he can from them," suggesting that beaver were then plentiful on the Trinity. Joseph Grinnell, in Fur-bearing Mammals of California, noted that beaver had been present on other Klamath River tributaries such as the Scott River and Shasta River, and further cited a Fish and Game report of beaver from 1915–1917 on High Prairie Creek at the mouth of the Klamath River near Requa, California. Within a matter of years, the plentiful beavers in the Klamath Basin had been mostly wiped out. Beaver dams had previously been an important factor in stream habitat in the Klamath River watershed, helping to moderate the power of floods and creating extensive wetlands. The loss of the beaver dams resulted in detrimental consequences for watercourses in the basin, exacerbating the power of winter floods, and causing severe erosion. Trapping parties eventually moved southwest into the Sacramento Valley and blazed an extension of the Siskiyou Trail, an early path between the Oregon Territory and San Francisco Bay. Despite the environmental implications, extensive and fertile meadows left behind by the draining of beaver ponds attracted many settlers to the region later on.

Gold rush

The 1850s saw discoveries of rich placer and lode gold deposits along the predominantly Shasta areas of the Klamath, Trinity, Shasta and other rivers in northwestern California. The 1850s also brought a greed-fueled murderous rampage upon the indigenous people inhabiting the regions. Villages full of men, women, children, and infants were either hacked up or shot for the potential gold that would be harmfully extracted. The gold is thought to have originated from volcanic activity in the Klamath Mountains. Miners searching for gold in the Klamath Mountains and Trinity Alps in the aftermath of the California Gold Rush first discovered gold along Salmon Creek in the spring of 1850, and additional deposits were found on the main stem by July. Gold was also discovered in great quantities in Shasta lands at French Gulch and Yreka. Several place names in the Klamath Basin originate from this era, including that of the Scott River, which is named for pioneer John Walter Scott. Gold deposits are still present in the Klamath River watershed even though it was mined far past the end of the gold rush.

After the establishment of California in 1850, the state government signed treaties with the Karuk establishing aboriginal territories but the treaties were never ratified in the senate and so the Karuk never got their own reservation land. In 1864, the Native Americans of the Klamath Basin and surrounding area signed a treaty that had them cede  of land to the United States and forced them to move to the newly created Klamath Indian Reservation. This reservation clumped the Yurok, Karuk, and Hoopa tribes into one small area. These reservation lands were created as a result of wars between American settlers and indigenous peoples including the Red Cap War in 1855. The US government wanted to stop these violent clashes and relegate the indigenous people to limited territory where they could be sovereign. This reservation policy was reversed in 1887 with the Dawes Act which designated allotments to individuals of indigenous descent who could stake claim. However into the 1920s many of these individual land owners sold away their allotments to timber companies as they could not affords the taxes. Eventually, the tribes began to profit from the sale of timber produced on the reservation, although unfairly distributed because of the lack of consideration of the three differing tribes. In 1954, however, Congress removed their federal recognition and the reservation was no longer economically successful. The tribes won back federal recognition in the 1970s, but by then poverty was widespread among tribal members. Additionally more indigenous land was lost in the 1970s after the completion of the construction of a section of highway 96 which ran through traditional Karuk territory and paved over cemeteries, villages, spiritual sites and allotments.

Colonization and assimilation 
One of the main Klamath tribal land stewardship practices of cultural burning was first disrupted with the beginning of Spanish colonization in California in the 1780s. Spanish colonization led to diseases, genocide, forced removal of indigenous people, relocation to missions, and laws banning burning in the region. In the 1840s many white Americans started moving west into the region with the Gold Rush.  Many more members of the Klamath tribes were displaced or killed in the destruction of villages and a series of wars over territory, among other threats. Into the 20th century, many Klamath children were separated from their tribes and families and forced to attend boarding schools which attempted to assimilate the children by forcing them to speak English and dress in Western clothing and eat Western foods. This led to a generational disconnect and loss of knowledge of many cultural practices.

Industry and development in the 20th century

Beginning in the early 20th century, steamboats began operating on Lower Klamath Lake between Siskiyou County, California, and Klamath Falls, Oregon. The steamboats completed a link between Klamath Falls and a railroad branch line following the McCloud River—the final part of which was called the Bartle Fast Freight Road, after Bartle, California. The end of this line, Laird's Landing, was the beginning of the Lower Klamath Lake steamboat line, which began operating with an  screw steamer in 1905. By 1909, however, the railroad had circumnavigated Lower Klamath Lake directly to Klamath Falls. The steamboat line fell into disuse—and much of Lower Klamath Lake was later drained and filled in.

In the early 1910s and 1920s, logging was a growing industry on the west side of the upper Klamath River valley, especially around Upper Klamath Lake. Many of the seasonal marshlands surrounding the lake and rivers were diked in this period to host lumber operations. Steamboats continued mail, passenger and freight operations on Upper Klamath Lake until about 1928, in a period when many of the lumber companies shut down due to drought.

With lumber a declining industry in the upper Klamath Basin, the economy slowly transitioned to agriculture. The Klamath Reclamation Project, established by the Bureau of Reclamation in the early 20th century, involved the construction of two dams on the river and additional dams on many of its tributaries, as well as the final draining of Lower Klamath and Tule Lakes. The Bureau of Reclamation was not the only user of the river during this period; in the late 1950s PacifiCorp and California-Oregon Power Company (COPCO) constructed three more dams on the river downstream. These dams, however, sparked a great controversy over water quality in the lower section of the river and the dependence of the river's annual salmon runs on it.

Klamath River Basin tribes today 
The Klamath River tribes consist of the Klamath, Yurok, Karuk, Hupa, and Shasta. The movement of forced creation of reservations in the United States resulted in the loss of culturally, ecologically, and economically significant land of indigenous peoples. While many of them are federally recognized sovereign nations, they are still fighting to reclaim the land and resources that were taken from them. The Klamath River tribes mission statements include the preservation of their cultural heritage along with their land and the resources it provides. The Klamath River basin tribes are deeply connected and entwined with their land. The Klamath river, the food it provides and the spiritual significance it holds, is centrally situated in the identities of all four tribes that live along the Klamath.

Yurok 
The Yurok tribe has almost 5,000 members, making it the largest federally recognized tribe in California. Federal recognition was given in 1855, in which the Yurok Reservation was created. Throughout the late 1800s, Yurok were moved to several newly established reservations, several of which were later destroyed or closed. The reservation covers around 63,000 acres along the coastal region of the lower Klamath River.

The Yurok people think of the Klamath river as “the Bloodline: the life blood of the people”  relying on it for foods like salmon (ney-ouy), sturgeon (Kaa-ka), candlefish (kwor-ror), and seaweed (chey-gel’). These foods, specifically fish and specifically from the Klamath river are of utmost important to the culture and religion of the Yurok tribe. Located along the river are various villages important to specific ceremonial practices of the Yurok, like the Jump Dance or the annual Salmon ceremony. Yurok culture and religion emphasizes direct connection and communication with the Klamath river. Yurok cosmologies and oral histories emphasize the importance of the Klamath river and its salmon as a gift from the creator to provide for the Yurok people. “Without this river we would not know who we are, where we’re from or where we’re going” said an elder in the tribal community. For the Yurok people, the health of the river and the salmon is indicative of the health of the tribe, making the current policies surrounding river dams, and declining salmon populations deeply personal. Like with other Klamath Basin Tribes, an annual salmon ceremony takes place to honor and celebrate the salmon, which the Yurok people see as ancestors. The Yurok tribe’s ceremonies emphasize the Klamath River, and many traditional practices require close proximity to the river and include some type of bathing in or ingesting of the water. Recreational games are played on constructed “courts” along the river banks.

The cycle of life in the Yurok culture is closely tied to the Klamath and those who have passed away are thought to take one last boat ride upriver.

Like the Karuk, the Yurok language references the Klamath river in their descriptions of direction.

Karuk 
The Karuk tribe recognized self-governance in 1994 and gained federal recognition in 1979. As the California legislature rejected treaties to create federal designated land, the Karuk peoples do not have a reservation. The Klamath Forest Reserve was created by the U.S. government in 1905 and claimed Karuk land as public land. Members have been working to reclaim parcels of their original land and place them in trusts.

The concept of World Renewal plays heavily into both Karuk and Yurok  culture. Although the term "world renewal" was coined by anthropologist Kroeber and Gifford, the Karuk tribe has adopted the phrase to refer to their annual ceremony that they view as essential to maintaining the reciprocal and stewarding relationship they  have with the environment. The ceremony is meant to renew and sustain this relationship. Many aspects of the larger ceremony involve being near or on the Klamath river, such as boat dances that take place in canoes and involve giving thanks and gratitude to the river. Salmon are an integral aspect of Karuk identity, culture, and subsistence. Karuk fisherman continue to sustainably fish for Salmon despite their decreasing numbers, drought and myriad other ecological issues. Ishi Pishi falls, located near the town of Somes Bar, remains the traditional location for Karuk men to fish. Karuk fishermen use a traditional dip-net fishing technique using long poles with nets on the end. This style of fishing works to naturally limit the amount of fish caught in a fishing session, thus ensuring that many salmon are able to spawn upstream and resupply the fishery.

The Karuk language also revolves around the Klamath River, and the word "karuk" means "upriver". To indicate uphill, the word maruk is used, meaning away from the river. Conversely, the word saruk, meaning towards the river, is used to indicate downhill.

Hupa 
The Hupa Valley Tribe is a federally recognized tribe with around 3,000 members. The reservation spans 80,000 acres and is the largest in California. It is located in the lower area of the Klamath River along the Trinity River. Around 3,000 people reside in the Hoopa Valley Reservation. Spanning around 85,000 acres, it is the largest reservation in California.

The Hupa Valley tribe hold similar ceremonial and religious beliefs regarding the river as the Yurok and Karuk people, including practices of jump dances and cultural/subsistence reliance on the Klamath's salmon runs.

Shasta 
Located in Northern California and Southern Oregon, the Shasta tribe is not federally recognized by the U.S. government due to the California legislature rejecting a treaty in 1851 that would have created a Shasta reservation. The tribe is currently in the process of gaining federal recognition.

Shasta people celebrate the first salmon of the season, which they think of as "salmon medicine" with ceremonies similar to the other Klamath basin tribes. Their relationship to the Klamath and its salmon was, and continues to be, deep-seated in their culture.

Klamath 
The Klamath Tribes, consisting of the Klamath, Modoc, and Yahooskin-Paiute, are a federally recognized tribe with around 4,800 members. The Klamath and United States federal government created a treaty in 1864 (that was ratified in 1870) which gave the Klamath sovereign rights to the new reservation. However, through the 1954 Termination Act, federal aid to the tribes was halted. After losing federal recognition in 1954, they regained the status in 1986. They are dispersed across Southern Oregon and Northern California. The Klamath Reservation covers around 300 acres along the western coast.

The Klamath Tribes, made up of the Klamath, Modoc and Yahooskin-Paiute people, reside in the Klamath Basin but hold many of their sacred ceremonies along the Sprague River.  The Upper Klamath Lake, and its fish populations, is also an important cultural and subsistence location for the Klamath Tribes.

Relationship to national forests 
In 1905, the United States Forest Service, an agency of the Department of Agriculture headed by Gifford Pinchot – a prominent conservationist and staunch opponent of burning – began to manage what was traditionally Klamath lands. The Forest Service oversaw extensive logging, mining, and dam construction, which degraded much of the environment, particularly salmon stocks and redwood forests. In 1947, the lower section of Karuk Aboriginal Territory was made part of the Six Rivers National Forest. In 1964, the first wilderness area in the Klamath basin was designated, effectively banning timber harvesting and road development in the area. Indigenous people were not allowed to steward their traditional territories because the Forest Service believed  they would further deplete the damaged ecosystems. This led to a legal battle in 1970 over whether Klamath tribes could fish in these territories. Not until the late 1990s and early 2000s did the Forest Service and Bureau of Land Management start collaborating with tribal peoples in the Offield Mountain Ceremonial Burning project and Tribal Forest Protection Act to incorporate traditional ecological knowledge and stewardship practices into land management.

Fish and wildlife

The river is considered a prime habitat for anadromous Chinook salmon (Oncorhynchus tshawytscha), coho salmon (Oncorhynchus kisutch), and steelhead trout (Oncorhynchus mykiss). Ancient DNA sequencing of archaeological samples from the Upper Klamath River Basin identified fish remains as Chinook salmon and steelhead trout, and geochemical analysis of strontium/calcium ratios confirmed that the fish were anadromous. These findings confirmed abundant historical observer records indicating that Chinook salmon ascended from the Pacific Ocean to use tributaries of Upper Klamath Lake for spawning, and that steelhead trout also spawned in the Upper Klamath River Basin, defined as the basin above Iron Gate Dam ( east of Hornbrook, California). Bull trout (Salvelinus confluentus) were once widespread throughout the Klamath River Basin, and were likely supported historically by migrating populations of anadromous salmonids. The offspring of these salmon and trout reared in the Upper Klamath Basin, and likely served as an important prey base for bull trout. Today, bull trout remain in a few tributaries to Upper Klamath Lake: Threemile Creek and Sun Creek to the northwest, and tributaries of the Sycan River and upper Sprague River to the east.

Once the river was the third-largest producer of salmon on the West Coast, after the Columbia and Sacramento Rivers, but the salmon run has been reduced since the construction of six dams between 1908 and 1962. Coho salmon in the Klamath River are listed as threatened under the Endangered Species Act. In 1963, the upper Trinity River—the largest single tributary to the Klamath—was virtually removed from the Klamath drainage with the completion of the Lewiston and Trinity Dams, diverting 90 percent of the upper Trinity's flow to the Sacramento Valley. From 1963 to 1991, only  from the main stem above the dams was left to flow to the Klamath.

From the 1920s to the 1960s, four hydroelectric dams were built by the California-Oregon Power Company (COPCO) and its successor PacifiCorp on the Klamath River main stem, blocking salmon and steelhead trout migration and trapping sediment that formerly replenished downstream gravel bars used by spawning salmon. The possible removal of the dams has been a controversial issue in the region in recent years. In January 2007, however, the federal government ruled that PacifiCorp must equip four dams with fish ladders, a modification which would potentially cost more than $300 million. PacifiCorp has offered $300 million to upgrade the JC Boyle fish ladder and proposed trucking fish around the Copco Number 1 and Iron Gate dams, after having had been denied a license to build a power generator in Utah. PacifiCorp President Fehrman defended the company's activities in the area, pointing to other benefits.

A separate controversy surrounds the use of water in the Upper Klamath Basin for irrigated agriculture, which was temporarily halted in 2001 to protect endangered salmon and lake fish during a severe drought. Vice President Dick Cheney personally intervened to ensure water to the agriculture industry rather than to environmental flow. In 2002, the federal government, under Interior Secretary Gale Norton, provided full water deliveries to irrigators as the drought continued; despite the fact that Klamath area tribes have treaty rights that predate the settlement of the farmers. Norton argued for a "free market" approach by allowing farmers to sell the water to the Native Americans downstream. That year, the Klamath River system had the largest fish die-off ever recorded.  The House Natural Resources Committee investigated Vice President Cheney for having released extra water to ranchers for possible political gain.

According to biologists from the State of California and the U.S. Fish and Wildlife Service, the atypical low flow in the river along with high fish return numbers and high water temperatures allowed for a gill rot disease to kill at least 33,000 salmon in September 2002, before they could reproduce. The die-off was downstream of the Trinity inflow, and the salmon of the Trinity were impacted to a greater degree than the Klamath as the Trinity run was at its peak. The report does mention that the official fish die-off estimate of 34,056 is probably quite low and could be only half of the actual loss.

In 2011, the U.S. Environmental Protection Agency (EPA) approved a plan first introduced in 1992 by California's state government. The plan called for major cleanup of the lower river in order to protect salmon from phosphorus, nitrogen, and carbonaceous biochemical oxygen demand. It also expressed concern over high water temperatures, algal blooms, and low oxygen levels, although certain fish have adapted to some of these issues. Environmental groups, more than six government agencies, Native American tribes in the basin, and others have worked with the EPA to reduce pollution levels in the Klamath.

Salmon controversy and proposed dam removal

Historically, the Klamath River was once the "third most productive salmon river system in the United States", after the Columbia and the Sacramento. Eutrophication and raised water temperatures induced by the construction of dams have created worsening conditions for migrating salmon, especially in years of drought.
Irrigation along the upper Klamath and the Shasta and Scott rivers, along with the almost-total diversion of the upper Trinity River, have all lowered the total river flow supporting out-migrating young salmon in spring and in-migrating adult salmon in the fall. In the 1960s, a project was proposed to divert the entire Klamath River to Central California and Southern California, an undertaking known as the Klamath Diversion, but this project was defeated. It would have limited salmon to the last  of the entire river. In 2002, a major fish kill took its toll on the river and the Tribes that depend on it. More than 34,000 salmon died alone, due to the low water flow and poor management. In 2005, PacifiCorp applied to the federal government to relicense its four hydroelectric dams on the Klamath for up to 50 years. Environmentalists opposed the relicensing, arguing that the dams should be removed to reopen the upper Klamath to salmon. Humboldt State University's Associated Students passed a resolution authored by activist Jason Robo in support of dam removal.

The Klamath Basin Restoration Agreement was signed on February 18, 2010.

Two years of closed-door negotiations among farmers, indigenous tribes, fishermen, conservation groups and government agencies had resulted in a plan to work toward a detailed settlement of Klamath water usage. It also called for the removal of four hydroelectric dams—the Iron Gate Dam and Copco dams 1 and 2 (in California), and the John C. Boyle Dam (in Oregon)—now operating along  of the Klamath River, starting in the year 2020, as well as for restoration projects.
A non-binding "Agreement in Principle" (AIP) among four parties—PacifiCorp, the federal government, California, and Oregon—to remove the four dams had been announced on November 13, 2008. PacifiCorp ratepayers would fund part of the plan and the State of California would fund much of the remaining projected cost. Total cost would be around $800 million. The agreement required the federal government to scientifically assess the costs and benefits of the dam removals, determine whether such action is in the public interest, and to make a final determination by March 31, 2012, as to whether the benefits of the project will justify the costs, although that deadline was missed. A local group, the Klamath County Tea Party Patriots, formed to oppose the agreement, and succeeded in unseating local elected officials who were supportive of the deal. On December 31, 2012, the parties renewed their agreement, providing more time for federal, Congressional, and California electorate approval to finalize dam removal.

On April 4, 2013, the U.S. Department of the Interior released its final environmental impact statement on the plan, recommending the removal of all four dams and $1 billion in other environmental restoration to aid native salmon runs on the Klamath. Ron Wyden, the senior U.S. senator from Oregon, introduced the Klamath Basin Water Recovery and Economic Restoration Act of 2014, which was cosponsored by his fellow Oregon senator Jeff Merkley and by Nevada senator Dean Heller.

Klamath River Renewal Cooperation (KRRC) is applying for complete license transfer of the Iron Gate, COPCO 1&2 (California and Oregon Power Company) and JC Boyle Dams to KRRC's jurisdiction. This license transfer is currently pending before the Federal Energy and Regulatory Committee (FERC). FERC should rule on complete license transfer to KRRC sometime in 2020.  Army Corps of Engineers Clean Water Certification will have to be sought as well once FERC grants license surrender orders to Pacific-Corp to KRRC jurisdiction. Kiewit Construction has been hired as the company for actual dam removal in early 2022. Construction costs for dam removal and remediation are estimated at around 450 million.  KRRC will fund and replace the City of Yreka's water supply pipeline that crosses the Klamath River underneath Iron Gate Reservoir.  Klamath River dam removal will represent the largest dam removal in US History for the purpose of restoring historic salmon runs on the Klamath.

On November 17, 2020, a Memorandum of Agreement (MOU) was signed by the states of California and Oregon, the Yurok Tribe, the Karuk Tribe, PacifiCorp and the Klamath River Renewal Corporation that describes how the parties will implement the amended Klamath Hydroelectric Settlement Agreement (KHSA) as negotiated and signed in 2016. The MOU asks FERC to remove PacifiCorp from the license for the project and add California, Oregon and KRRC as co-licensees for carrying out dam removal. The signing parties plan to navigate the final regulatory approvals necessary to allow the project to begin in 2022 with dam removal in 2023. Site remediation and restoration will continue beyond 2023.

Water rights dispute
When the 1864 treaty was signed, the Klamath Tribes, with much less land, became short on the stream water needed for fishing. Although from the 1950s to the 1970s they were not federally recognized, the tribes never lost their water rights, and in 2001, when Klamath Basin farmers twice sued the U.S. Department of the Interior for more access to irrigation water, their rights were upheld. The tribes' water allotments for fishing continue to be a large factor in Klamath Basin water disputes in the 21st century. In 2013, the Tribe's water rights were enforced for the first time, in what is known as a 'Water Call'. The Klamath Tribe called upon their in-stream water right, which was enforced by the Water Master. This resulted in almost all upper-basin irrigation being denied water, except for groundwater irrigators. The Klamath Project, however, was not called upon. During the 2020–21 North American drought, tribes, farmers and animals suffered loss of water, increasing their internal conflict.

Recreation

Whitewater rafting and kayaking are popular recreational activities along the upper Klamath River below the J.C. Boyle Dam, and also along the lower Klamath River downstream of the town of Happy Camp. Beyond Weitchpec, the river slows down into a wider, deeper channel. About  of the river is designated Wild, and  Recreational.

Sport fishing is also popular on the Klamath River, with steelhead trout being the most popular, though Chinook salmon are also highly sought after when low salmon returns do not prevent fishing. A fly fishing guide said that the Klamath was one of the most productive steelhead rivers on the West Coast of the United States.

Recreational gold mining is popular along the Klamath and some of its tributaries, including the Salmon and the Trinity. Although simple methods such as panning are still used, some methods use suction pumps—a practice involving turning over deposits of sediment and spreading them in order to find gold. Debates over the practice, which opponents contend damage water quality (mercury) and fish habitat, continue. Since at least 2016, suction dredge mining is banned in California.

A variety of national forests and wildlife preserves—including the Klamath National Forest, Six Rivers National Forest, Klamath National Wildlife Refuges Complex, and Lower Klamath National Wildlife Refuge—are located in the Klamath River watershed. The Klamath National Forest is located in Siskiyou County with a small portion in Oregon, and Six Rivers National Forest is located in the southern Klamath watershed, mostly in the Trinity River watershed. The latter two are located in the Upper Klamath Lake-Lower Klamath Lake area. Lava Beds National Monument, which contains a large array of lava tubes and formations, is also in the Lower Klamath Lake area, to the south of the remnants of the lake.

Iron Gate Dam is the lowermost dam on the Klamath River and effectively cuts off migration and spawning habitat of more than 675 kilometers of the Upper Klamath Basin. These dams cut off opportunity for recreation, like guided salmon fishing, in the Upper Klamath Basin. The four major Klamath River dams are on course for removal in the near future. Once these dams are removed they may provide many new opportunities for Tourism development. The hydrology of the river may change dramatically once the dams are removed, this may create new rapids and areas in which NEAT (Nature, Environmental, and Adventure tourism) can take hold and provide more economic opportunities for local residents of the Klamath Basin.

Before the construction of Iron Gate Dam, salmon had access to over 970 km of spawning and rearing habitat in the Upper Klamath Basin. Once the Upper Klamath Basin is opened up for salmon migration this will create a more diverse river ecosystem, providing more opportunities for recreational fishing and new economic opportunities like guided salmon fishing tours. Also opportunities for ecotourism can be maintained to view and help conserve a new habitat for salmon in the Upper Klamath Basin.

Klamath Salmon Festival 
An annual festival takes place along the Klamath River to honor the mighty salmon by Yurok people. The Klamath Salmon Festivals are usually in August and include games, meals, parades, and other ways of celebrating.

See also 
 List of California rivers
 List of longest streams of Oregon
 List of National Wild and Scenic Rivers
 List of rivers of Oregon

References

Notes

Works cited

External links

 Klamath RiverKeeper 
 Mid Klamath Watershed Council
 State of California hydrological monitoring of the Klamath and tributaries.
 NASA Earth Observatory: drought and irrigation shut off in the Klamath Basin
 Earth Island Journal – The Story Behind the World's Biggest Dam Removal – Rough Water
 EcoTipping Points Project Klamath River Restoration
 Klamath Wild and Scenic River - BLM page

 
Klamath Mountains
Klamath National Forest
Redwood National and State Parks
Rivers of Del Norte County, California
Rivers of Humboldt County, California
Rivers of Klamath County, Oregon
Rivers of Northern California
Rivers of Oregon
Rogue River-Siskiyou National Forest
Six Rivers National Forest
Wild and Scenic Rivers of the United States